Stanford Viaduct is a railway viaduct in Leicestershire and Nottinghamshire. It is named after the nearby village of Stanford on Soar.

Built as part of the Great Central Railway's London Extension opened in 1899, it carried the Great Central Main Line over the River Soar and a road (Meadow Lane). It was built out of blue brick by the contractor, Henry Lovatt of Wolverhampton. The three central arches are skewed to allow the Soar to pass underneath.

When the rest of the GCML was closed in the 1960s, the section from Loughborough South Junction was kept open as a branch of the Midland Main Line to the British Gypsum works at East Leake.

Presently, the viaduct is used by gypsum trains, and diesel or steam heritage trains of the Great Central Railway (Nottingham).

References

External links
Stanford Viaduct in background of photo

Railway viaducts in Leicestershire
Railway viaducts in Nottinghamshire
Skew bridges
Great Central Railway (preserved)